"Rhythm of the Rain" is a song performed by The Cascades, released in November 1962. It was written by Cascades band member John Claude Gummoe. On March 9, 1963, it rose to number 3 on the Billboard Hot 100, and spent two weeks at number 1 on Billboards Easy Listening chart. Billboard ranked the record as the number 4 song of 1963.

In March 1963, the song was a top 5 hit in the United Kingdom and, in May that same year, was a number 1 single in Ireland. In Australia it rose to number 2. In Canada, the song was on the CHUM Chart for a total of 12 weeks and reached number 1 in March 1963. In 1999 BMI listed the song as the 9th most performed song on radio/TV in the 20th century.

The Cascades' recording was used in the soundtrack of the 1979 film Quadrophenia, and included in its soundtrack album.

The song arrangement features distinctive use of a celesta.

The sound of rain and thunder are heard at the beginning and at the end of the song.

Theme
The lyrics are sung by a man whose lover has left him; the rain falling reminds him 'what a fool' he has been. He rhetorically asks the rain for answers, but ultimately he wishes it would 'go away' and let him cry alone.

Chart performance

Weekly charts

Year-end charts

Sylvie Vartan version (in French) 

The song was adapted into French (under the title "En écoutant la pluie", meaning "Listening to the Rain") by Richard Anthony. It was recorded by Sylvie Vartan, who released it as a single in 1963.

According to the charts published by the U.S. magazine Billboard (in its "Hits of the World" section), the song "En écoutant la pluie" reached number one in France.

Track listings 
7-inch single RCA Victor 45.277 (1963, France)
 A. "En écoutant la pluie" (Rhythm of the Rain)
 B. "Jamais" (Late Date Baby)

7-inch EP Sylvie à l'Olympia RCA 86.007 (1963, France)
 A1. "En écoutant la pluie"
 A2. "Jamais"
 B1. "Avec moi"
 B2. "Mon ami"

Charts

Other charting versions
Dutch teen idol Rob de Nijs covered the song in 1963 as "Ritme van de regen". Though originally a B side, the song kick started his career and remains popular today.
Brazilian singer Demétrius (1942-2019) released a version of the song in Portuguese in 1964 as "O Ritmo Da Chuva".
Gary Lewis & the Playboys released a version of the song in 1969 that reached No. 63 on the Billboard Hot 100 chart.
Pat Roberts released a version of the song in 1972 that reached No. 34 on the Country chart.
Jacky Ward released a version of the song in 1978 that reached No. 11 on the Country chart.
Neil Sedaka released a version of the song in 1984 that reached No. 37 on the adult contemporary chart.
Dan Fogelberg released a version of the song in 1990 that reached No. 3 on the adult contemporary chart.
Jason Donovan also released a version of the song on 20 August 1990 that reached No. 9 on the UK Singles Chart.  Donovan re-recorded the song for his 2008 album Let It Be Me.

See also
List of number-one adult contemporary singles of 1963 (U.S.)
Number-one singles of 1963 (Ireland)
List of 1960s one-hit wonders in the United States

References

External links
 John Gummoe's website

1962 songs
1962 singles
1963 singles
1972 singles
1978 singles
1984 singles
1990 singles
The Cascades (band) songs
Sylvie Vartan songs
Gary Lewis & the Playboys songs
Jacky Ward songs
Neil Sedaka songs
Dan Fogelberg songs
Jason Donovan songs
Jan and Dean songs
Chris de Burgh songs
Irish Singles Chart number-one singles
Valiant Records singles
RCA Victor singles
Mercury Records singles
MCA Records singles
Columbia Records singles
Torch songs
Songs about weather